Gramacks (or "Les Gramacks") was a Cadence-lypso group from Dominica.

Biography
The band is from Saint-Joseph, a village from Dominica. The lead singer Jefferson "Jeff" Joseph and keyboard player McDonald "Markie" Prosper along with the other members were former students of the Dominica Grammar School and St Mary's Academy, hence the name Gramacks. The band rose to fame in the early seventies and eighties with hits like “Mis Debaz”, and “Soukouyant”.

Gramacks and Exile One were influential figures in the promotion of cadence-lypso in the 1970s. They were an inspiration for the French Antilles band Kassav and the emergence of zouk in the 1980s. The full-horn section kadans band Exile One led by Gordon Henderson, and Gramacks (led by Jeff Joseph) introduced the newly arrived synthesizers to their music that other young cadence or compas bands from Haiti (mini-jazz) and the French Antilles emulated in the 1970s. 

Gramacks rose to prominence in the 1970s to the early 1980s with a Super Bowl performance.  They headlined the first World Creole Music Festival in Dominica in 1997. Creative differences and financial mismanagement caused the band to break up with members pursuing individual solo projects. Jeff Joseph later formed Volt Face and Gramacks New Generation.

Jefferson "Jeff Joe" Joseph
Jeff Joseph "Jeff Joe" of Saint Joseph, Dominica was the leader and founder of Dominica's cadence musical group "Gramacks". His musical career with Gramacks began in the early 1970s in Guadeloupe. 

The late Joseph will be remembered for his energetic performances of songs such as ‘Soucouyant’, ‘Soleil Trop Chaud’, and ‘Woy Mi Debas’. Many of his recordings were done in the Debs Studio in Martinique. Joseph is known for adding various Caribbean styles to his musical identity such as reggae, calypso and mostly cadence or compas music. Joseph was lead member Gramacks New Generation and a founding member of the Antillean group Volt Face along with Georges Decimus; one of the founders of Kassav in the 1980s.

Joseph was one of Dominica’s goodwill ambassadors and he played a part in the promotion and marketing of the World Creole Music Festival. At the 13th World Creole Music Festival in Dominica, compas musician "Sweet Mickey" (who would serve as Haiti's president between 2011 and 2016) gave tribute and recognition to Joseph on a Dominica source video interview for his influence on his music. At the 15th Annual WCMF, he was honored by Dominica's bouyon music band "Triple Kay International" during their performance for his influence on the band.

Musicians 

 Singer : Jeff Joseph and Georges "Soul" Thomas
 Guitarist : Anthony "Curvin" Serrant
 Bassist : Anthony "Tepam" George
 Drummers: Elon "Bolo" Rodney
 keyboard player  : Mc Donald "Mckie" Prosper
 Trombone Player : Anthony "Bone" Pierre 1976-1980
 Trumpet Player : Bill "Billo" Thomas 1974-1976

Discography

Gramacks 

 Gramacks
 Symbol of determination in Paris
 Gramacks international
 Wooy midebar
 African connection
 Leurs derniers succès
 Gramacks and Hippomène
 Politik anthology
 La vie disco
 Ka allez haut
 Paroles en bouche pas maître
 Roots Caribbean Rock
 The Gramacks featuring Jeff Joseph
 Pa ka gadé douvan
 Creole mix : maxi single
 Party party / Hot music : 2 titres
 Make you dance
 The Gramacks
 Gramacks 1974-1976
 The very best of
 Gramacks Best of
 Gramacks New Collector
 Get Up

Gramacks new generation 

 Gramacks New Generation
 Jeff Joseph and Gramacks New Generation
 Live
 Best of Gramacks New Generation Live
 Live à St Joseph
 Gramacks forever
 Get Up

Dominica musical groups